Charke is a surname. Notable people with the surname include:

 Charlotte Charke, (1713–1760), English actress
 Derek Charke (born 1974), Canadian classical composer and flutist 
 Richard Charke ( 1709– 1738), English violinist, composer, operatic baritone, and playwright